An observation tower is a structure used to view events from a long distance and to create a full 360 degree range of vision to conduct long distance observations. Many modern towers are also used as TV towers, restaurants, or churches. The towers first appeared in the ancient world, as long ago as the Babylonian Empire.

Observation towers that are used as guard posts or observation posts over an extended period to overlook an area are commonly called watchtowers instead.

Construction and usage
Observation towers are an easily visible sight on the countryside, as they must rise over trees and other obstacles to ensure clear vision. Older control rooms have often been likened to medieval chambers. The heavy use of stone, iron, and wood in their construction helps to create this illusion. Modern towers frequently have observation decks or terraces with restaurants or on the roof of mountain stations of an aerial ropeway. Frequently observation towers are used also as location of radio services within the UHF/VHF range (FM sound broadcasting, TV, public rural broadcasting service, and portable radio service). In some cases this usage of the tower is at least as important as its use as an observation tower. Such towers are usually called TV towers or telecommunication towers. Many towers are also equipped with a tower restaurant and allow visitors access via elevators. Also common is the usage of water towers as observation towers. As in the case of TV towers the visitor will usually reach the observation deck by elevator, which is usually at a lower height above ground The typical height of the observation deck of water towers is 20 metres up to 50 metres, while the typical height of the platform of TV towers is from 80 metres up to 200 metres. Finally, some church towers may have observation decks, albeit often without an elevator. Many other buildings may have towers which allow for observation.

Types

Dedicated observation towers 

In particular prior to World War I rambler associations, and some municipalities, built observation towers on numerous summits. Usually these towers were built of stone, however sometimes wood or iron was also used. At nearly all these towers access to the observation deck, usually at a height of between 5 and 40 metres, is only possible by way of stairs. Most of these towers are used only for tourism, however some of these towers might also be used, at times of high forest fire risk, as fire observation posts or in times of war as military observation posts with anti-aircraft positions placed beside it. Further uses were not intended at most of these buildings, although some of these towers today now carry antennas for police/fire engine radios, portable radio or low power FM- and TV-transmitters. Older observation towers frequently have a flag pole at its top.

Some of these towers are permanently accessible, either free or with the payment of an admission fee. Others are accessible only at certain times, in most cases only with the payment of an admission fee. At these towers the platform is usually open, with some having a restaurant in the basement. There are also towers with a much more extensive use; for example. the observation tower on Rossberg mountains in Reutlingen contains a hotel within its structure.

Although most of these towers were initially built before World War I, such structures are still being built, in particular as attractions at horticultural shows. Modern observation towers are in most cases no longer built of brick, but concrete, steel and wood are used as the preferred building materials.

Permanent observation towers are also sometimes found in amusement parks, however in parks where each attraction is not separately paid for, panorama rides are preferred.

Watch towers 

Watch towers are observation towers, on which persons supervise a larger area. Strictly speaking, control towers also fall into this category, although surveillance from these structures is mostly done in a non-optical way using Radar. Watch towers usually have a closed pulpit to protect the observer against bad weather. Watch towers do not have an elevator as a rule, since these buildings are mostly not higher than 20 metres. Active watch towers are not as a rule accessible to the public, since they usually serve for the monitoring of sensitive ranges. However watch towers can be quite ordered for forest fire monitoring a platform accessible for the public or be used during times without forest fire risk as observation towers. Shut down watch towers can however be easily converted to observation towers.

Radio towers 

Also some radio towers were so built that they can be used apart from their function as transmitting tower also as observation tower. A condition for this is a sufficiently stable construction, which permits a permanent safe visitor entrance without interruption of the transmission services. This is the case for towers for radio services in the UHF/VHF-range the case, not however for most types of radio towers for long and medium wave, why a use of these structures as observation tower is impossible in most cases. That the use of a tower as radio tower for medium wave and observation tower not well fits, showed up in Radio Tower Berlin, which originally carried together with an 80 metres high mast a t-antenna for medium wave and stands on insulators. However one notices at the first experimental transmissions that at the tower voltages would arise, which would have unpleasant consequences for visitors and so the tower was grounded by the elevator shaft. However this shifted direction of main beam of transmitter away from actual supply area, the city of Berlin. As before World War II nearly whole radio traffic took place in the long -, medium and shortwave range, first after World War II with introduction of radio services in UHF/VHF-range required towers only acting as antenna carriers, radio towers with observation decks built. For this the closed reinforced concrete construction way was nearly always used. Radio towers with observation decks often serve for TV transmission or for radio relay link services and are called therefore usually TV tower or telecommunication tower. As a rule an elevator is available in these buildings for the visitors of the observation deck, as the observation deck lies usually very highly (mostly within the range between 50 and 200 metres, at some towers also more highly). Many of these towers have also a tower restaurant, which can be designed as revolving restaurant. While tower restaurants for the protection of the restaurant guests from the wind are in closed rooms, the prospect platform can be open or in a closed room. An open platform is more favourable for photographing, since no reflexes at the disk arise, while closed platforms are for many visitors more pleasant. Prospect outlooks on TV towers are opened only at certain times and their entrance is possible only under payment of an admission fee.

Highrise buildings 

Also numerous highrise buildings have observation decks, sometimes even a restaurant. The height of these platforms, which can be glassed or open-air depending on the height of the building, where they are most common on the topmost floor. As a rule access usually requires the payment of an admission fee, is possible by elevator only at dedicated opening times.

Water towers 

Also numerous water towers have, a usually open-air observation deck opened for public traffic, whose height is mostly as the height of older observation towers in the height range between 10 and 50 metres. It can be reached depending upon tower by stairs or by an elevator. Some water towers have also a tower restaurant. Prospect platforms of water towers are nearly only accessible under payment during the opening times, which are different for each tower.

Church towers 

Also some church towers possess observation decks. However elevators are only available in rare cases. The entrance of this platform is in contrast to the entrance of the church usually only possible under payment an admission fee at the opening times of the church. The height of the observation decks is usually in the range between 20 and 50 metres. The platform is nearly always open-air.

Lighthouses 

Some lighthouses have an observation deck open to the public. Access is usually by stairs. An admission fee is often charged and hours may be limited. The observation deck of a lighthouse is usually between 10 and 50 metres high, and is almost always open air.

Sports facilities 
Some sports facilities have high buildings with observation decks. This is often the case at ski jumps, as these have a tower and are usually unused in the summer. In addition, there are other sports facilities with observation decks, like the inclined tower of the Montreal Olympic stadium. Access to the platform of nearly all sports facilities with observation deck is only possible during opening times after paying an admission fee.  Depending upon the building the access can be done by an elevator and/or a stairway. The platforms can be vitreous or open. The height above ground lies usually between 10 and 50 metres.

Fire lookout towers

Fire lookout towers have been used widely in Australia, Canada, and the United States to hoist fire lookout persons to heights where they can identify and report new wildfires.  In the United States, there once were over 5,000 fire lookout towers.

Other towers 

There are also some very unusual observation towers, which fit not well into one of these categories. Examples for this are the Henninger Turm, a grain silo with tower restaurant and observation deck in Frankfurt, the bell tower of Berlin Olympic stadium, whose platform is accessible by an elevator, the winding tower of the mining industry museum in Bochum, which has an open-air observation deck to which an elevator runs or a wind turbine in Holtriem wind park, which is equipped with a closed platform accessible over stairs. Also aerial tramway support towers, which serve as observation tower (and aerial tramway station), were realized, like Torre Jaume I in Barcelona. Even on the pylons of suspension bridges were already observation decks installed, as the example of Nový Most in Bratislava shows.
A very unusual observation tower is Pont basculant de la Seyne-sur-Mer. It was once a bascule bridge, now permanently put upright and used as observation tower.

History

Germany
In Germany, observation towers first appeared on the countryside at the end of the 18th century. These early towers were often built by wealthy aristocrats. It wasn't until the mid-19th century that citizens took control of the construction of such towers.  In Austria and Switzerland many observation towers were established by alpine and tourist associations, and continue to be cared for by them. In the Waldigen Mountains, many citizen committees were active. Because of the long reign of emperor Franz Joseph, many observation decks carry the name "anniversary observation platform". The invention of the elevator in the late 19th century made taller observation decks possible.  Most notably, the Eiffel Tower and the Blackpool Tower were built in this era. Radio towers developed as combined sending and observation tower between 1924 and 1926 in the city of Berlin. After World War II, a great need for tall observation towers arose, due to their dual usage as television and radio transmitters. In large cities, the desire existed to provide these towers with a tower restaurant and an observation deck, in order to make the building of towers more economical via admission fees and increased notability. Several water towers were also built with this in mind, but many have not survived to the modern day.

United States

Notable examples

Australia 

Sydney Tower (formerly known as "Centrepoint Tower" and "AMP Tower") is the tallest building in Sydney, New South Wales and the second tallest observation tower in the Southern Hemisphere.

Austria 

Another observation tower sits atop the Gallitzinberg forest which in 1956 replaced an older steel tower that had been erected in 1899. Therefore, the present tower is still colloquially known as the Jubiläumswarte ("jubilee tower").

Canada 
The CN Tower in Toronto, Ontario is one of the world's tallest observation towers. It previously held the title of tallest free standing structure in the world until 2008 where it was surpassed by the completion of the Burj Khalifa. The Skylon Tower in Niagara Falls, and the Calgary Tower are also notable.

France 

Germany 
Berlin Radio Tower is 150 meters tall. It was built by Straumer, and has a steel lattice construction. It was inaugurated on September 3, 1926. The world's first FM radio programs were broadcast from the tower. It also broadcast the first regular television program, the 1936 Summer Olympics.

Henninger Turm was the world's only silo tower with an observation deck accessible to the public.

Windpark Holtriem is one of the few wind turbines with an observation deck accessible to the public.

Iran 
Milad Tower is a tower in Tehran.

Iraq
Baghdad Tower, previously called Saddam Tower replaced a communications tower destroyed during the Persian Gulf War. It was completed in 1994 and stands at 205 m (673 ft).

Malaysia 

The Netherlands 
The Euromast in Rotterdam gives views over the largest port in Europe. The observation deck is at  while the rotating lift reaches .

New Zealand 

The Sky Tower in Auckland is the tallest observation tower in the Southern Hemisphere.

Norway 

The Slottsfjellet Tower in Tønsberg is a 17 metres high dedicated observation tower. It was completed in 1888 during the city's 100-year anniversary.

Spain 
Torre Jaume I is a support pillar of the aerial tramway in Barcelona. It is equipped with an observation deck.

United Kingdom 

The Blackpool Tower (still standing) and the New Brighton Tower (demolished) resembled smaller versions of the Eiffel Tower, while Watkin's Tower at Wembley, if completed, would have been taller than the Eiffel Tower.

Radio City Tower (alternatively St. John's Beacon) is a 1960's observation tower in Liverpool which has been granted listed status.

The i360 in Brighton is a  observation tower and the world's first vertical cable car.

The Spinnaker Tower in Portsmouth is a  observation tower looking over Portsmouth Harbour.

United States
Enger Tower, the Reunion Tower in Dallas, Seattle's Space Needle, Gatlinburg, Tennessee's Space Needle, Observation Towers at the New York State Pavilion and the Tower of the Americas are some examples of observation towers in the United States. Clingmans Dome Observation Tower and some others are operated by the National Park Service.

See List of tallest observation towers in the United States and :Category:Observation towers in the United States.

See also
 Deck (building)
 Gyro tower
 List of tallest towers in the world
 Observation car
 Observation deck
 Observation wheel

Notes

References

Joachim Kleinmanns: Schau ins Land. Aussichtstürme. Marburg: Jonas-Verlag, 1999, 152 S. brosch., 20 EUR,